An ordinariate for the faithful of Eastern rite is a geographical ecclesiastical structure for Eastern Catholic communities in areas where no eparchy of their own particular Church has been established. This structure was introduced by the apostolic letter Officium supremi Apostolatus of 15 July 1912.

In the Annuario Pontificio the eight existing ordinariates of this kind are listed together with the fifteen (pre-diocesan) apostolic exarchates. Of these ordinariates, four (in Argentina, Brazil, France and Poland) are generically for all Eastern Catholics who lack a 'proper' diocesan jurisdiction of their own rite in the particular country and who are therefore entrusted to the care of a Latin Archbishop in the country. The one in Austria is for Catholics belonging to any of the fourteen particular Churches that use the Byzantine Rite. The other three (Ex-Soviet 'Eastern Europe', Greece and Romania) are exclusively for members of the Armenian Catholic Church.

Existing ordinariates

Former ordinariates 

 Ordinariate of the Albanians in Sicily (Italy, promoted to Italo-Albanese Catholic Eparchy of Piana degli Albanesi)
 Ordinariate of Poland for Greek and Armenian Catholics, became the present all-rites Ordinariate for Eastern Catholics in Poland

See also 

 List of Catholic dioceses (structured view)
 Exarch(ate)
 Personal ordinariate
 Military ordinariate

References

External links 
 GigaCatholic

Eastern Catholic dioceses
Catholic canonical structures
Eastern Catholic canon law